The 1944 Minnesota gubernatorial election took place on November 7, 1944. Republican Party of Minnesota candidate Edward John Thye defeated Minnesota Democratic–Farmer–Labor Party challenger Byron G. Allen.  As the Democratic Party of Minnesota and Farmer–Labor Party merged earlier in the year, this was the first gubernatorial election in which the parties ran a combined ticket.  The vote change below reflects the departure from the combined Democratic and Farmer–Labor totals in 1942.

Results

See also
 List of Minnesota gubernatorial elections

External links
 http://www.sos.state.mn.us/home/index.asp?page=653
 http://www.sos.state.mn.us/home/index.asp?page=657

Minnesota
Gubernatorial
1944
November 1944 events